Mancalla is an extinct genus of prehistoric flightless alcids that lived on the Pacific coast of today's California and Mexico during the Late Miocene to Early Pliocene.

References 

Auks
Extinct flightless birds
Neogene birds
Prehistoric bird genera